Khezerlu (also Romanized as Khez̄erlū and Khezerloo; also known as Khedarlū, Khezerlū-ye Bālā, and Kheẕerlū-ye Soflá) is a village in Qarah Quyun-e Jonubi Rural District, Qarah Quyun District, Showt County, West Azerbaijan Province, Iran. At the 2006 census, its population was 761, in 176 families.

References 

Populated places in Showt County